Allan Musoke (born 1980) is a Ugandan rugby union player. He plays as a wing. Professionally, he works as a Human Resource Systems officer at Uganda Telecom Ltd.

Musoke practised several sports since his youth years. He played basketball for DMark Power in the FUBA League, from 1996 to 1999, as a shooting guard, and football for Nsibirwa Hall at Makerere University, from 2000 to 2002, as a striker, until he decided to dedicate himself exclusively to rugby union.

Musoke is one of the best Ugandan rugby players of the present, even if he never played abroad. His team is currently UTL Kobs. He was for two times the MVP of the Ugandan rugby league.

He plays at international level for Uganda, being currently the top scorer for the "Cranes". He was a key player in the team that won the CAR Africa Cup on 29 September 2007, in a 42–11 win over Madagascar, in a game where he scored a try.

Musoke also played for the African Leopards multinational team, on July 23, 2005, in the 15–30 loss to the South African Students, in Ellis Park, Johannesburg.

He decided to play again basketball for DMark Power in the FUBA league, of Uganda, in 2009, while also continuing his rugby career.

References

External links
Allan Musoke Interview

1980 births
Living people
Ugandan rugby union players
Rugby union wings
Ugandan men's basketball players
Ugandan footballers
Shooting guards
Association footballers not categorized by position